Spindle cell carcinoma is a type of cancer that begins in the skin or in tissues that line or cover internal organs and that contains long spindle-shaped cells. It is also called sarcomatoid carcinoma.

See also
 Spindle cell sarcoma
 Spindle cell squamous cell carcinoma

External links 

 Spindle cell cancer entry in the public domain NCI Dictionary of Cancer Terms

Carcinoma